Palmadusta lentiginosa is a species of sea snail, a cowry, a marine gastropod mollusk in the family Cypraeidae, the cowries.

Subspecies
 Palmadusta lentiginosa buhariensis (Jonklaas & Nicolay, 1977) (taxon inquirendum)
 Palmadusta lentiginosa dancalica (Jonklaas & Nicolay, 1977) (taxon inquirendum)

Description

Distribution
This species occurs in the Red Sea.

References

 Vine, P. (1986). Red Sea Invertebrates. Immel Publishing, London. 224 pp

External links
 Gray, J.E. (1824-1828). Monograph on the Cypraeidae, a family of testaceous Mollusca. Zoological Journal
 Zenetos, A.; Çinar, M.E.; Pancucci-Papadopoulou, M.A.; Harmelin, J.-G.; Furnari, G.; Andaloro, F.; Bellou, N.; Streftaris, N.; Zibrowius, H. (2005). Annotated list of marine alien species in the Mediterranean with records of the worst invasive species. Mediterranean Marine Science. 6 (2): 63-118

Cypraeidae
Gastropods described in 1825
Taxa named by John Edward Gray